John Whooley, now John Whoolilurie, is a California-based musician best known for playing the saxophone and other instruments with the band Estradasphere. In addition to performing, he also composed much of the band's music until he left the band to live in Joshua Tree, California.

Whooley was also a member of the "jam supergroup" Santa Cruz Hemp Allstars, put together by Santa Cruz promoter -- Poco Marshall. Other side projects include Phree Radicals, Netwerk: Electric and his soloproject, Whoolilicious. With his wife Moriah-Melin, he formed the band MoJoW and the Vibration Army. When performing live, the Army uses electronic looping pedals to layer  multiple instruments or vocals in real time. MoJoW toured Europe in the summer of 2005, and released their first album, Undivided, later that year. They released their second record Work With What You Got in 2007 in the style of Saxappella (a cappella grooves and sax).

Performing Discography

with Estradasphere
It's Understood (LP) (2000)
These Are The Days (VHS) (2000)
The Silent Elk of Yesterday (EP) (2001)
Buck Fever (LP) (2001)
Quadropus (LP) (2003)
Passion for Life (LP/DVD) (2004)
These Are The Days (DVD Reissue) (2005)

as Whoolilicious
Nuthin' but The Whooley (LP) (2002)

with MoJoW
Undivided (LP) (2005)
Work With What You Got (LP) (2007)

External links
http://vibrationarmy.com/ Official MoJoW homepage

Year of birth missing (living people)
Living people
American male saxophonists
People from Joshua Tree, California
21st-century American saxophonists
21st-century American male musicians